William George (29 June 1874 – 4 December 1933) was a footballer who played for Aston Villa from October 1897 to July 1911. His previous clubs were the now defunct Woolwich Ramblers, Army football for the Royal Artillery and Trowbridge Town when he was on leave. He was signed by Aston Villa from the Army for £50 in 1897. He played in 356 league matches and 40 cup matches.

While at Villa Park, George kept goal in three Villa title winning sides in 1899, 1900 and 1910 as well as their 1905 cup winning side. Conversely he was also in goal when Villa suffered a humiliating F A Cup defeat against Southern League Millwall Athletic in 1900.

His international career was limited and he had 3 caps with the England team in 1902. He was sold to Birmingham City as a player/trainer in 1911.

He is regarded as one of the best goalkeepers to have played for Aston Villa in its history.

George also played 13 first-class cricket matches as a batsman with Warwickshire. He also played county cricket for Wiltshire and, in 1900, for Shropshire while a club professional player at Shrewsbury.

William George appears on the Professional Footballers' Association's list of former Aston Villa players who served in the First World War but details of his service in the war are lacking.

Notes

External links

1874 births
1933 deaths
Trowbridge Town F.C. players
Aston Villa F.C. players
Association football goalkeepers
English footballers
England international footballers
English cricketers
Warwickshire cricketers
Sportspeople from Shrewsbury
Wiltshire cricketers
English Football League players
English Football League representative players
FA Cup Final players
19th-century British Army personnel
Royal Artillery personnel
British military personnel of World War I
Military personnel from Shrewsbury